Calliteara is a genus of tussock moths in the family Erebidae. The genus was erected by Arthur Gardiner Butler in 1881.

Species

The pudibunda species group
Calliteara argentata (Butler, 1881)
Calliteara cerigoides  (Walker, 1862)
Calliteara grotei  (Moore, 1859)
Calliteara horsfieldii  (Saunders, 1851)
Calliteara pudibunda  (Linnaeus, 1758)
Calliteara zelotica (Collenette, 1932)
The strigata species group
Calliteara strigata (Moore, 1879)
The varia species group
Calliteara diplozona (Collenette, 1932)
Calliteara lairdae (Holloway, 1976)
Calliteara pseudolairdae Holloway, 1999
Calliteara varia (Walker, 1855)
The angulata species group
Calliteara angulata (Hampson, 1895)
Calliteara aphrasta (Collenette, 1938)
Calliteara argyroides (Collenette, 1932)
The minor species group
Calliteara box Holloway, 1991
Calliteara cox Schintlmeister, 1994
Calliteara minor (Bethune-Baker, 1904)
The fidjiensis species group
Calliteara fidjiensis (Mabille & Vuillot, 1890)
Calliteara nandarivatu (Robinson, 1968)
Unknown species group
Calliteara abietis  (Denis & Schiffermüller, 1775)
Calliteara angiana (Joicey & Talbot, 1916)
Calliteara apoblepta (Collenette, 1955)
Calliteara arizana (Wileman, 1911)
Calliteara axutha (Collenette, 1934)
Calliteara baibarana (Matsumura, 1927)
Calliteara brunnea (Bethune-Baker, 1904)
Calliteara cerebosa (Swinhoe, 1903)
Calliteara cinctata (Moore, 1879)
Calliteara complicata (Walker, 1865)
Calliteara conjuncta (Wileman, 1911)
Calliteara contexta Kishida, 1998
Calliteara enneaphora (Collenette, 1955)
Calliteara farenoides (Lucas, 1892)
Calliteara flavobrunnea  Robinson, 1969)
Calliteara fortunata (Rogenhofer, 1891)
Calliteara hesychima  Collenette, 1955)
Calliteara himalayana Kishida, 1994
Calliteara kaszabi (Daniel, 1969)
Calliteara katanga (Collenette, 1938)
Calliteara kenricki (Bethune-Baker, 1904)
Calliteara kikuchii (Matsumura, 1927)
Calliteara lunulata (Butler, 1887)
Calliteara melli (Collenette, 1934)
Calliteara multilineata (Swinhoe, 1917)
Calliteara polioleuca (Collenette, 1955)
Calliteara postfusca (Swinhoe, 1895)
Calliteara pseudabietis Butler, 1885
Calliteara pura (Lucas, 1892)
Calliteara saitonis (Matsumura, 1927)
Calliteara solitaria (Staudinger, 1887)
Calliteara subnigra (Bethune-Baker, 1904)
Calliteara subnigropunctata (Bethune-Baker, 1904)
Calliteara taiwana (Wileman, 1910)
Calliteara virginea (Oberthür, 1879)
Calliteara wandammena (Bethune-Baker, 1916)
Calliteara wolongensis (Chao, 1986)

References

External links
 

Lymantriinae
Moth genera